Gordon Sandeman (1810 – 14 March 1897) was an Australian politician and a member of the New South Wales Legislative Assembly, Queensland Legislative Assembly, and the Queensland Legislative Council.

Early life
Sandeman was born in Edinburgh and was the son of a merchant. He emigrated to the Moreton Bay district in 1838 and established a mercantile business. He also acquired significant pastoral interests in the Wide Bay and Burnett districts. After suffering some financial difficulties in the 1880s Sandeman returned to the United Kingdom where he died aged 87.

State Parliament of New South Wales
In the first election for the New South Wales Legislative Assembly in 1856, Sandeman was elected unopposed as the member for Moreton, Wide Bay, Burnett and Maranoa. Sandeman's election occurred prior to the separation of Queensland from New South Wales in 1859 and his electorate was in an area which is currently part of South-East Queensland. He resigned from parliament after 18 months to concentrate on his business interests.

State Parliament of Queensland
After Queensland separated from New South Wales, Sandeman represented the seat of Leichhardt in the Queensland Legislative Assembly from 1863 to 1870. In 1874 he was then appointed to the Queensland Legislative Council, holding that position till it was declared vacant in 1886.

References

 

1810 births
1897 deaths
Members of the New South Wales Legislative Assembly
19th-century Australian politicians
Members of the Queensland Legislative Assembly
Members of the Queensland Legislative Council